Webb County is a county located in the U.S. state of Texas. As of the 2020 census, its population was 267,114. Its county seat is Laredo. The county was named after James Webb (1792–1856), who served as secretary of the treasury, secretary of state, and attorney general of the Republic of Texas, and later judge of the United States District Court following the admission of Texas to statehood. By area, Webb County is the largest county in South Texas and the sixth-largest in the state. Webb County comprises the Laredo metropolitan area. Webb County is the only county in the United States to border three foreign states or provinces, sharing borders with Coahuila, Nuevo Leon, and Tamaulipas.

Webb County has a minority majority, with 95.2% of the population of the county identifying as Hispanic. This makes Webb the county with the second-highest proportion of Hispanic people in the continental United States after Starr County, and it has the highest proportion of Hispanic people among counties with a population over 100,000.

History

Webb County was split in 1856. Encinal County was established on February 1, 1856, and was to have consisted of the eastern portion of Webb County. However, Encinal County was never organized and was finally dissolved on March 12, 1899, with its territory returned as part of Webb County.

Much of Webb County history is based on the prevalence of ranching in the 19th century and continuing thereafter. The Webb County Heritage Foundation is a nonprofit organization that seeks to preserve documents and artifacts of the past to guarantee that the regional history is not lost to upcoming generations. In 2015, the foundation, headed by President James E. Moore, presented Heritage Awards to such local notables as the artist Janet Krueger, journalist Maria Eugenia Guerra, and Laredo Community College art instructor Martha F. Fenstermaker (1943-2014).<ref>Gabriel A. Trevino, "Preservation of history", Laredo Morning Times, May 24, 2015, pp. 1, 17A</ref>

Geography

Major highways
The Webb County - City of Laredo Regional Mobility Authority has responsibility for a comprehensive transport system in the region.

 
 
 
 
 
 
 
 
 
 
 
 
 
 
 
 
 
 
 
 

Adjacent counties and municipalities

 Dimmit County (north)
 La Salle County (north)
 Duval County (east)
 Jim Hogg County (southeast)
 Zapata County (south and southeast)
 Maverick County (northwest)
 McMullen County, Texas (northeast)
 Guerrero, Coahuila, Mexico (west)
 Hidalgo, Coahuila, Mexico (west)
 Anáhuac, Nuevo León, Mexico (west)
 Nuevo Laredo, Tamaulipas, Mexico (south)
 Guerrero, Tamaulipas, Mexico (southwest)

DemographicsNote: the US Census treats Hispanic/Latino as an ethnic category. This table excludes Latinos from the racial categories and assigns them to a separate category. Hispanics/Latinos can be of any race.As of the 2015 Texas Population Estimate Program, the population of the county was 273,536. The racial makeup of the county was 99.8% White and 0.2% Black or African American.  The ethnic makeup of the county was non-Hispanic whites 8,699 (3.2%), Black Americans 552 (0.2%), and other non-Hispanic 2,134 (0.8%). Hispanics and Latinos (of any race) 262,151 (95.8%).

As of the census of 2000, 193,117 people, 50,740 households, and 43,433 families resided in the county. The county gained 57,000 additional residents between 2000 and 2010. The population density was 58 people/sq mi (22/km2). The 55,206 housing units averaged 16/sq mi (6/km2). The racial makeup of the county was 82.16% White, 0.37% Black or African American, 0.47% Native American, 0.43% Asian, 14.02% from other races, and 2.54% from two or more races. About 94% of the population was Hispanic or Latino of any race.

Of the 50,740 households, 53.20% had children under  18 living with them, 62.60% were married couples living together, 18.30% had a female householder with no husband present, and 14.40% were not families; 12.40% of all households were made up of individuals, and 5.10% had someone living alone who was 65 years of age or older. The average household size was 3.75, and the average family size was 4.10.

In the county, the age distribution was 36.20% under  18, 11.40% from 18 to 24, 29.30% from 25 to 44, 15.60% from 45 to 64, and 7.60% who were 65  or older.  The median age was 26 years. For every 100 females, there were 92.90 males.  For every 100 females age 18 and over, there were 87.90 males.

The median income for a household in the county was $28,100, and for a family was $29,394. Males had a median income of $23,618 versus $19,018 for females. The per capita income for the county was $10,759.  About 26.70% of families and 31.20% of the population were below the poverty line, including 39.40% of those under age 18 and 26.90% of those age 65 or over.

Politics

Given the overwhelming Democratic allegiance in Webb County, Republicans rarely proffer candidates for county office. In the March 4, 2014, primary, 1,151 (4.6 percent) voted in the Republican primary in Webb County, compared to 23,958 (95.4 percent) in the Democratic contests. Webb County elections administrator Carlos Villarreal reported a 24% turnout in the November 4, 2014, general election in Webb County. County officials have requested that Villarreal develop a plan to increase turnout for 2016. County Democratic Chairman Alberto Torres, Jr., suggested improvements in the election division website with clear maps of voter boundaries. Torres said that such better services might motivate persons to vote regularly.

Education
Three school districts serve Webb County:
 Laredo Independent School District
 United Independent School District
 Webb Consolidated Independent School District

Prior to 1994, Webb CISD served only Bruni and Oilton. Mirando City Independent School District served the community of Mirando City from 1923 to 2005. Prior to 1994, all Mirando City children attended Mirando City ISD schools. After the spring of 1994, Mirando City High School closed. Therefore, from the fall of 1994 to July 1, 2005, WCISD served high schoolers from Mirando City, while Mirando Elementary School in the Mirando City ISD served pupils from kindergarten through eighth grade. On May 9, 2005, the Texas Education Agency ordered the closure of Mirando City ISD. The district closed on July 1, 2005, and all students were rezoned to Webb CISD schools.

The private Holding Institute is a former United Methodist boarding school operating as a downtown Laredo community center.

All residents are zoned to Laredo Community College.

Communities
Cities
 El Cenizo
 Laredo (county seat)
 Rio Bravo

Census-designated places

 Aguilares
 Bonanza Hills
 Botines
 Bruni
 Colorado Acres
 Four Points
 Hillside Acres
 La Coma
 La Moca Ranch
 La Presa
 Laredo Ranchettes
 Laredo Ranchettes West
 Las Haciendas
 Las Pilas
 Los Altos
 Los Arcos
 Los Centenarios
 Los Corralitos
 Los Fresnos
 Los Huisaches
 Los Minerales
 Los Nopalitos
 Los Veteranos I
 Los Veteranos II
 Mirando City
 Oilton
 Pueblo East
 Pueblo Nuevo
 Ranchitos East
 Ranchitos Las Lomas
 Ranchos Penitas West
 San Carlos I
 San Carlos II
 Sunset Acres
 Tanquecitos South Acres
 Tanquecitos South Acres II
 Valle Verde

Other unincorporated communities

 Cactus
 Callaghan
 D-5 Acres Colonia
 East Gate Acres Colonia
 Las Tiendas
 Minera
 Old Milwaukee East
 Old Milwaukee West
 Palafox
 Ranchitos los Mesquites Colonia
 Ranchitos los Veteranos Colonia
 San Pablo
 San Ramon
 Village East Colonia
 Webb

Ghost towns
 Darwin
 Islitas
 Los Ojuelos
 Pescadito
 Santo Tomas

Gallery

See also

 List of museums in South Texas
 National Register of Historic Places listings in Webb County, Texas
 Recorded Texas Historic Landmarks in Webb County
 Webb County Courthouse

References

Further reading
 Lambert, R.B. (2004). Hydrogeology of Webb County, Texas'' [Scientific Investigations Report 2004-5022]. Reston, VA: U.S. Department of the Interior, U.S. Geological Survey.

External links
 Webb County government's website
 Webb County in Handbook of Texas Online at the University of Texas
 Webb County Heritage Foundation  

 
1848 establishments in Texas
Laredo–Nuevo Laredo
Populated places established in 1848
Majority-minority counties in Texas
Hispanic and Latino American culture in Texas